The 3rd Cruiser Squadron  was a formation of cruisers of the British Royal Navy from 1902 to 1909 and 1911 to 1916  and then again from 1922 to 1941.

History

First formation
The squadron was first formed in June 1902 and disbanded in March 1909

Rear-Admiral Commanding
Included:

Second formation
The squadron was reformed in December 1911 and disbanded in September 1916.

Rear-Admiral Commanding

Included:

Third formation
The squadron reformed in December 1922 during the interwar years. It was in operation during World War II and was disbanded in March 1941.

Rear-Admiral/Vice-Admiral Commanding

Included:

References
Footnotes

Sources
  Mackie, Gordon. 2018) "Royal Navy Senior Appointments from 1865" (PDF). gulabin.com. Gordon Mackie.
 Willmott, H. P. (2009). The Last Century of Sea Power, Volume 1: From Port Arthur to Chanak, 1894–1922. Indiana University Press. .
 Watson, Dr Graham. (2015) "BETWEEN THE WARS: ROYAL NAVY ORGANISATION AND SHIP DEPLOYMENTS 1919–1939". www.naval-history.net. Gordon Smith.

Cruiser squadrons of the Royal Navy
Military units and formations of the Royal Navy in World War II